Pietro Gaddi (1644–1710) was a Roman Catholic prelate who served as Bishop of Spoleto (1695–1710).

Biography
Pietro Gaddi was born on 3 Nov 1644 in Forlì, Italy.
On 7 Feb 1695, he was appointed during the papacy of Pope Innocent XII as Bishop of Spoleto.
On 6 Mar 1695, he was consecrated bishop by Bandino Panciatici, Cardinal-Priest of San Pancrazio, with Sperello Sperelli, Bishop of Terni, and Giovanni Giuseppe Camuzzi, Bishop of Orvieto, serving as co-consecrators. 
He served as Bishop of Spoleto until his death in Sep 1710.

While bishop, he was the principal co-consecrator of Domenico Folgori, Titular Archbishop of Nazareth (1695).

References

External links and additional sources
  (for Chronology of Bishops)  
 (Chronology of Bishops) 

17th-century Italian Roman Catholic bishops
18th-century Italian Roman Catholic bishops
Bishops appointed by Pope Innocent XII
1644 births
1710 deaths